Stewart Manor may refer to:

 Stewart Manor, New York
 Stewart Manor (LIRR station)
 Stewart Manor (Charles B. Sommers House), a historic home in Indianapolis, Marion County, Indiana